The Boole Tree is a giant sequoia in the Giant Sequoia National Monument, Fresno County, California. The Boole Tree is the eighth tallest sequoia in the world and is the largest in terms of base circumference at 112 feet. It is estimated to be more than 2,000 years old.  The tree's stature is accentuated by its isolation above the Kings River where it towers over the rest of the forest.

The Boole tree is the largest in the Converse Basin Grove, which is 5 miles (8 km) from the General Grant Grove in Kings Canyon National Park. Converse Basin used to be a large grove, but was logged of most of its giant sequoias between 1892 and 1918. Now only perhaps 60–100 large specimens survive out of thousands. However, this grove is still the second largest contiguous grove in the world.

Namesake
The Boole Tree was named around 1895 by A.H. Sweeny, a Fresno doctor, after Franklin A. Boole, a supervisor of the logging operation who spared the tree due to its great size.

Description
The Boole Tree was once thought to be the largest tree in the world, but it is now known to be the sixth largest, with five other giant sequoias surpassing it in size: the General Sherman, General Grant, President, Lincoln, and Stagg trees.

Located among shorter Scouler willows that have grown in the area following logging, the tree stands out at a height of 268 feet. It is likely growing faster due to a lack of competition in its modified environment, and its survival may also be attributed to the reduction of fuel in the area since logging ceased in the 1900s.

Dimensions

See also
 Big Lonely Doug - a large Douglas fir whose immediate surroundings were also clearcut
 List of largest giant sequoias
 List of oldest trees
 List of individual trees

References

 

Individual giant sequoia trees
Giant Sequoia National Monument
Natural history of Fresno County, California